The 1999 season was São Paulo's 70th season since club's existence.

Statistics

Scorers

Overall

{|class="wikitable"
|-
|Games played || 70 (8 Torneio Rio-São Paulo, 17 Campeonato Paulista, 4 Copa do Brasil, 6 Copa Mercosur, 26 Campeonato Brasileiro, 2 Copa Libertadores seletive, 5 Friendly match)
|-
|Games won || 41 (5 Torneio Rio-São Paulo, 12 Campeonato Paulista, 2 Copa do Brasil, 3 Copa Mercosur, 13 Campeonato Brasileiro, 1 Copa Libertadores seletive, 5 Friendly match)
|-
|Games drawn || 7 (1 Torneio Rio-São Paulo, 4 Campeonato Paulista, 1 Copa do Brasil, 1 Copa Mercosur, 1 Campeonato Brasileiro, 0 Copa Libertadores seletive, 0 Friendly match)
|-
|Games lost || 20 (2 Torneio Rio-São Paulo, 2 Campeonato Paulista, 1 Copa do Brasil, 2 Copa Mercosur, 12 Campeonato Brasileiro, 1 Copa Libertadores seletive, 0 Friendly match)
|-
|Goals scored || 148
|-
|Goals conceded || 88
|-
|Goal difference || +60
|-
|Best result || 5–0 (H) v Bayer Leverkusen - Friendly match - 1999.01.205–0 (A) v Cruz Azul - Friendly match - 1999.07.22
|-
|Worst result || 1–5 (A) v Boca Juniors - Copa Mercosur - 1999.08.01
|-
|Top scorer || 
|-

Friendlies

Euro-America Cup

La Soccer Cup

Trofeo Ciudad de Pachuca

Official competitions

Torneio Rio-São Paulo

Record

Campeonato Paulista

Record

Copa do Brasil

Record

Campeonato Brasileiro

Amended result by justice
Round 3

Round 16

 Sandro Hiroshi played in irregular condition

Record

Copa Mercosur

Record

Copa Libertadores selective tournament

Record

External links
official website 

São Paulo
São Paulo FC seasons